Rabbi Shmuel Halpert (born 5 February 1939) is an Israeli politician and a former member of the Knesset for the ultra-Orthodox party Agudat Yisrael (in which he represents the Vizhnitz Hasidim), part of the United Torah Judaism alliance. He is also a member of the party's central committee, and a member of the executive of World Agudat Israel.

Biography
Born in Cluj in Romania in 1939, Halpert is the grandson of Rabbi Mordechai of Nadvirna and Rabbi Yisroel Yaakov of Khust. He studied at the Vyzhnytsia Institute of Talmudic Studies, and was ordained as a rabbi. He made aliyah in 1960.

Halpert was first elected to the Knesset in the 1981 elections on the Agudat Israel list. However, he lost his seat in the next elections in 1984.

He re-entered the Knesset after the 1988 elections, and was appointed Deputy Minister in the Prime Minister's Office in November 1990. In June 1991, he became Deputy Minister of Labour and Social Welfare.

For the 1992 elections, Agudat Israel formed an alliance
with Degel HaTorah, which included a seat rotation agreement. Halpert was elected to the Knesset, but served only half a term (until 1994) as part of the arrangement. He retained his seat served full terms after the 1996 and 1999 elections, but lost it in the 2003 elections. However, after United Torah Judaism split towards the end of the Knesset term in 2005, Yisrael Eichler resigned as an MK, and was replaced by Halpert as part of another rotation agreement. Halpert was also appointed Deputy Minister of Transportation.

For the 2006 elections, the alliance was reformed, and Halpert was elected to the Knesset on the UTJ list. Like many other religious politicians in Israel, he objected to the 2006 Jerusalem gay pride parade, asking, "Have we become like Sodom? Let go of this ugliness. It will oust the divine presence." He has also caused controversy by admitting to hitting his children during a Knesset committee meeting and calling for the separation of the sexes in the Western Wall Plaza.

He lost his seat in the 2009 elections.

References

External links

1939 births
Living people
Politicians from Cluj-Napoca
Romanian Orthodox rabbis
Israeli Orthodox rabbis
Romanian emigrants to Israel
Agudat Yisrael politicians
Members of the 10th Knesset (1981–1984)
Members of the 12th Knesset (1988–1992)
Members of the 13th Knesset (1992–1996)
Members of the 14th Knesset (1996–1999)
Members of the 15th Knesset (1999–2003)
Members of the 16th Knesset (2003–2006)
Members of the 17th Knesset (2006–2009)
Deputy ministers of Israel
Deputy Speakers of the Knesset
Rabbinic members of the Knesset